The Assistant Chief of the Naval Staff (Foreign) was a senior British Royal Navy appointment. The post holder was part of the Admiralty Naval Staff and member of the Board of Admiralty from 1940 to 1945.

History
Established in December 1940 as a new position to ease the burden of the responsibilities on the Assistant Chief of Naval Staff. The post holder was a part of the Admiralty Naval Staff and member of the Board of Admiralty. He was chiefly responsible for supervising the directors of naval staff divisions such as the Gunnery Division (Foreign), Operations Division (Foreign) and the Warfare Division till 1945.

Office holders
Included:
 Rear-Admiral Sir Henry Harwood, — (December 1940–April 1942) 
 Rear-Admiral H. Bernard H. Rawlings, — (April 1942–February 1943)
 Rear-Admiral Reginald M. Servaes, — (February 1943–March 1945)
 Rear-Admiral Gerald Bellars, — (March–October 1945)

References

A